The women's artistic individual all-around gymnastic event at the 2019 Pan American Games was held on July 29 at the Polideportivo Villa el Salvador in Lima, Peru. Ellie Black of Canada successfully defended her title from the 2015 Pan American Games.

Schedule
All times are Peru Time (UTC-5).

Results

Final
Oldest and youngest competitors

Source:

Qualification
Riley McCusker of the United States qualified in first place with 57.050 points. Eight gymnasts did not advance to either the final or as a reserve due to the two-per-country rule.

Source:

References

Gymnastics at the 2019 Pan American Games
Pan American Games 2019